"Tell Me I'm Not Dreamin' (Too Good to Be True)" is a song by Jermaine Jackson featuring his younger brother Michael Jackson, taken from Jermaine Jackson's eponymous album. Jason Elias of Allmusic called this song "percolating and infectious."

The vocal version of "Tell Me I'm Not Dreamin'" was on the B-side to both the 7" and 12" versions of Jermaine Jackson's single, "Do What You Do", while an instrumental version of the song was on the B-side to another Jermaine Jackson song, "Dynamite".

In her 1993 book Michael Jackson: The King of Pop, author Lisa D. Campbell states that "although it was never officially released as a single because of legal difficulties between Michael's label, Epic, and Jermaine's label, Arista, the song did receive a lot of airplay." As a result, Billboard did not include the song on any "singles" chart. Nor, at the time, did Billboard publish an airplay-only chart. The song, however, did register on Radio and Records′ Top 40 chart, a chart based solely on airplay, peaking at No. 6 in June 1984. The song was most successful on the Billboard Hot Dance Club Play chart, where it spent three weeks at No. 1 that same June. The song was performed as a medley with some of Jermaine Jackson's other solo hits ("Let's Get Serious" and "Dynamite") on the Jacksons' 1984 "Victory Tour".

The song was nominated at the 1985 Grammy Awards for Best R&B Performance by a Duo or Group with Vocals.

In 1988, Robert Palmer covered the song on his album, Heavy Nova. It was released as a single in June 1989 and reached #60 on the Billboard Hot 100.

See also
List of number-one dance singles of 1984 (U.S.)

References

1984 singles
1989 singles
Jermaine Jackson songs
Michael Jackson songs
Robert Palmer (singer) songs
Male vocal duets
Songs written by Michael Omartian
Song recordings produced by Michael Omartian
Songs written by Bruce Sudano
Arista Records singles
1984 songs
American new wave songs
American synth-pop songs